KPOW-FM (97.7 FM) is a radio station broadcasting a classic hits music format. Licensed to La Monte, Missouri, United States.  The station is owned by Benne Media.

References

External links

Pettis County, Missouri
POW-FM
Classic hits radio stations in the United States
Radio stations established in 1983
1983 establishments in Missouri